WEJK may refer to:

 WEJK-LP, a low-power radio station (100.7 FM) licensed to serve Connersville, Indiana, United States
 WJPS, a radio station (107.1 FM) licensed to serve Boonville, Indiana, which held the call sign WEJK from 2005 to 2014